The 1992 UEFA European Under-16 Championship was the tenth edition of UEFA's European Under-16 Football Championship. Cyprus hosted the championship, during 7–17 May 1992. 16 teams entered the competition, and Germany won their second title, their first after their reunification.

Squads

Participants

Results

First stage

Group A

Group B

Group C

Group D

Semi-finals

Third place match

Final

References

RSSSF.com
UEFA.com

1992
UEFA
1991–92 in Cypriot football
1992
May 1992 sports events in Europe
1992 in youth association football